The Inheritance or Fuckoffguysgoodday is a 1992 Czechoslovak comedy film directed by Věra Chytilová. It was entered into the 18th Moscow International Film Festival.

Cast
 Bolek Polívka as Bohus
 Miroslav Donutil as Dr. Ulrich
 Šárka Vojtková as Irena
 Anna as Anna (herself)
 Arbias as Arbias 'the Great Warrior' (himself)
 Jozef Kroner as Kostál
 Dagmar Veškrnová as Vlasta
 Anna Pantůčková as Aunt
 Pavel Zatloukal as co-worker/communist
 Břetislav Rychlík as Francek
 Ján Sedal as Ranger
 Arnošt Goldflam as Arnošt
 Martin Dohnal as Railway worker
 Jiří Pecha as Angel / Dr. Strázný
 Leoš Suchařípa as Dr. Siroký
 Jaromír Dulava as Waiter in Luxus
 Ivana Chýlková as Dr. Ulrichová
 Karel Gott as himself
 Alena Ambrová as Liduna
 Miloš Černoušek as Waiter in Slavia
 Simona Peková as Selling woman
 Miroslav Výlet as Mayor

References

External links
 

1992 comedy films
1992 films
Czechoslovak comedy films
1990s Czech-language films
Films directed by Věra Chytilová
Czech comedy films